On 12 October 2022, two people were killed, and a third person was wounded, in a shooting in Bratislava, Slovakia. The shooting occurred in front of the Tepláreň gay bar, a well-known spot frequented by the local LGBT community. The deceased individuals were Juraj Vankulič, a non-binary person, and Matúš Horváth, who was bisexual. The perpetrator was found dead the morning after the attack.

The shooting was declared an anti-LGBT hate crime. As of 17 October 2022, it is under investigation and is classified as a terrorist attack.

Shooting

According to security camera footage, the attacker, dressed in all black, wearing a black cap and a black face mask, arrived at the crime scene at approximately 18:35 local time. He then hid in an alcove next door from Tepláreň for about half an hour.

First responders reported two people dead, while the woman was transported a hospital and was in stable condition. The police closed off all surrounding streets and began searching for the killer with the aid of a police helicopter. At 19:48, police had reported the shooting on social media and warned the public to stay vigilant, as the killer remained at large.

The attacker was found dead elsewhere in Bratislava at around 07:00 the next day. The police stated the cause of death was most likely suicide, as he was found with a gunshot wound to the head. The Twitter account had been suspended by the time the perpetrator's body was discovered.

Investigation 
Police did not initially determine a motive for the shooting. On October 14, the police confirmed it as being investigated as a hate crime with the possibility for the crime to be reclassified as a terrorist attack.

On October 14, the police stated they did not have any information about the attacker's sympathies for extreme ideologies prior to the killing. The police refused to confirm or deny whether the attacker had foreign accomplices, but confirmed that the investigation of the crime will include Interpol and the Federal Bureau of Investigation.

The police confirmed reports that the attacker returned to his home after the shooting. He had a fight with his parents who reportedly knew of the attack but did not report it to the police. The attacker switched the murder weapon with another one, which he later used for suicide. The murder weapon was found in the house alongside a suicide note. The parents are under investigation for failure to report the suspicious behavior of their son to the police.

Perpetrator 
The day prior to the attack, Twitter account NTMA0315 published statements including "I have made my decision", "it will be done" and "Race First. Always". It also posted links to an original manifesto with extremist far-right anti-semitic, homophobic and transphobic views. In addition to Twitter, the murderer also posted his pictures on 4chan.

The Twitter account also contained several selfies of a teenage man, Juraj Krajčík, later identified as the perpetrator, including one from August 2022 in front of Tepláreň and another one in front of the home of the Prime Minister Eduard Heger, whom he also mentioned as the top priority target in his manifesto. In addition to the prime minister, the manifesto mentioned other politicians as targets, including the former education minister Branislav Gröhling and the opposition leader and former prime minister Robert Fico.

The perpetrator's father had previously ran in the 2020 Slovak parliamentary election as a candidate for the nationalist right-wing party Homeland. According to Matej Medvecký, a counter-extremism expert, the murderer had also subscribed to the ideology of Accelerationism, supported by terrorist groups such as Atomwaffen Division.

Manifesto 
Just a few hours before the attack, links to a 65-page long manifesto were posted on Twitter. In the document, the author does not provide their name, claiming it is not of importance and "will be known later anyway", but identifies himself as a man of Slovak origin born on July 28, 2003, who has decided to "execute an operation" against "the enemies of the white race".

The manifesto blames Jews and LGBT people for "causing harm to white people" and celebrates mass murderers, including Anders Breivik and the perpetrators of Christchurch mosque shootings and Poway synagogue shooting.  The manifesto mentions the author's hatred for Islam as his first politically incorrect position. The text also attributes COVID-19 pandemic and vaccination measures to a "Jewish plot to train the white race to be obedient" and denies the Holocaust. It also glorifies a 22-year-old Slovak man in particular, known on Telegram as Slovakbro, who was arrested by the police in May 2022 for promoting right-wing extremism and calling for the overthrow of the democratic system in Slovakia by means of sabotage and terrorism.

The Telegram group known as Terrorgram was mentioned in his manifesto, and credited with "Building the future of the White revolution, one publication at a time."

Suicide 
Juraj Krajčík shot and killed himself a short time after October 12.

Aftermath 
On 13 October 2022, president Zuzana Čaputová came down to Tepláreň to commemorate the victims. She gave a short speech to the media. An improvised march to the SNP square followed, with hundreds of attendees. Another march took place the same day in Košice, with a few hundred participants.

On 14 October 2022, a vigil titled "March against Hatred", organized by the local LGBT advocacy group Iniciatíva Inakost, took place in Bratislava. Participants marched from Tepláreň to the SNP square, where the proprietor of Tepláreň, president Zuzana Čaputová, mayor of Bratislava Matúš Vallo and governor of Bratislava region Juraj Droba as well as other Slovak politicians and celebrities gave speeches commemorating the victims, denouncing the crime and expressing support to the LGBT community. Prime Minister Eduard Heger was in the crowd, but did not give a speech. It is estimated that around 15,000 to 20,000 people have participated.

On 16 October 2022, a protest took place in front of the Slovak National Council building as a reaction to the attack.

On Terrorgram, which Krajčík cited as inspiration for the shooting, Dallas Humber called him "St. Juraj Krajčík, Tarrant’s sixth disciple and Terrorgram’s first saint", one of the instances of sanctification done in the group.

Reactions

Domestic 

The attack was condemned by many political representatives, including mayor of Bratislava Matúš Vallo, and mayor of Old Town district Zuzana Aufrichtová. President Zuzana Čaputová pointed out the likely hateful motive of the act and stated that this hatred towards minorities had been fueled for a long time by "the stupid and irresponsible statements of politicians," whom she called on to stop hateful rhetoric "before more lives are lost". A rainbow flag was raised in solidarity with the LGBT community at the Grassalkovich palace.

Prime Minister Eduard Heger condemned the attack and said "It is unacceptable that anyone should fear for their life because of their way of life..." He later apologized for describing one's sexual orientation this way and stated support for the LGBT community.

The rector of Comenius University Marek Števček issued a press release informing that a student of the Faculty of Arts, Matúš Horváth, was one of the two victims of the shooting. The rector condemned the killing and called for the entire society to unite against hate and discrimination. The Faculty of Arts installed the rainbow flag on its building as a sign of its solidarity with the LGBTI community.

International 
Among foreign state and political representatives, Czech Prime Minister Petr Fiala expressed his condolences to the survivors of the victims. At the same time, the Czech Minister of the Interior, Vít Rakušan, added that there is no place in a decent society "for unjustified discrimination of LGBT people". President of the European Commission Ursula von der Leyen expressed her condolences and added that "We have to protect the LGBTIQ community".

See also
 2022 Oslo shooting
 Orlando nightclub shooting
 1999 London nail bombings
 Terrorgram, shooter was member of the Terrorgram and cited it in his manifesto

Notes

References

2022 in LGBT history
Alt-right terrorism
Attacks on bars in Europe
Neo-fascist terrorist incidents
Violence against LGBT people in Europe
Deaths by firearm in Slovakia
Murder in Slovakia
2022 shooting
October 2022 crimes in Europe
October 2022 events in Slovakia
2022 murders in Europe
LGBT in Slovakia
Attacks on nightclubs
2022 suicides
Hate crimes